Bulgarian Lovers (Los novios búlgaros) is a 2003 Spanish romantic comedy-drama film directed by Eloy de la Iglesia. The plot centers around Daniel, a gay aristocratic lawyer in Madrid. He is part of a group of gay Spanish men who cruise for sex, which is treated as a form of domination. Daniel forms a relationship with an attractive Bulgarian expatriate, Kyril, for whom he makes extraordinary efforts, such as forging papers and smuggling uranium. Daniel and his wealth are contrasted with Kyril and his good looks, as the film explores the connections between wealth, power, and sex.

Cast
 Fernando Guillén Cuervo - Daniel
 Dritan Biba - Kyril
 Pepón Nieto - Gildo
 Roger Pera - Lawyer
 Anita Sinkovic - Kalina

References

External links 

2003 drama films
2003 films
Spanish LGBT-related films
Gay-related films
Films shot in Bulgaria
Films directed by Eloy de la Iglesia
2000s Spanish films